Manuel Fernández Fernández (21 January 1923 – 12 June 2012), known as Pahiño, was a Spanish footballer who played as a striker.

Over 12 seasons, he played 278 games in La Liga, scoring 211 goals for Celta, Real Madrid and Deportivo. He won one Pichichi Trophy each with the first two clubs.

Club career
Born in the neighbourhood of San Paio de Navia in Vigo, Province of Pontevedra, Pahiño joined RC Celta de Vigo in 1943, immediately becoming a starter. He only scored four La Liga goals in his first season (from 15 appearances), being relegated.

After the team's return to the top flight, Pahiño never scored less than 15 times until his departure. In the 1947–48 campaign, his league-best 21 goals helped them finish a best-ever fourth and reach the final of the Copa del Generalísimo.

In summer 1948, both Pahiño and Miguel Muñoz signed for Real Madrid. He continued to find the net at a regular rate for his new club, winning his second Pichichi at the end of 1951–52. However, he lost his importance in the squad following the arrival of Alfredo Di Stéfano, who later admitted his frustration of never having played alongside him; across all competitions, he scored 124 goals in 143 matches, ranking 13th in the all-time scoring list at the time of his death.

Until his retirement in 1957, at the age of 34, Pahiño represented Deportivo de La Coruña (top division, three seasons) and Granada CF (Segunda División). On 30 October 1955, whilst at the service of the former, he scored twice in a 2–1 win over his former employer at the Santiago Bernabéu Stadium.

Over a fortnight in February 1956, Pahiño acted as player-coach for Deportivo. The team conceded 12 goals in three games, which included losses against FC Barcelona (0–7, home) and Deportivo Alavés (2–4).

International career
Pahiño earned three caps for Spain, over seven years. He scored on his debut on 20 June 1948, against Switzerland, adding a brace in his final appearance, a 2–2 draw with the Republic of Ireland in another friendly.

Style of play
An ambidextrous player that excelled in the physical aspects of the game, Pahiño possessed a powerful shot with either feet as well as a tremendous heading ability. In 1945, during a promotion play-offs clash against Granada, he played more than 40 minutes with a broken fibula after a challenge by José Millán, in an eventual 4–1 away win.

Personal life
Pahiño received his nickname after a variation of his father's second surname, Paíño. He was an avid reader of the works of Fyodor Dostoyevsky and Leo Tolstoy.

A half-time incident during the international with Switzerland, in which he sarcastically grinned as the team was being harangued by General Gómez Zamalloa, who was also vocal to the National Sports Delegation, may have led to the small number of appearances for his country. He died in the capital Madrid on 12 June 2012, aged 89.

Career statistics

Club

International goals

Honours

Individual
Pichichi Trophy: 1947–48, 1951–52

References

External links

Biography at Real Madrid Fans 

1923 births
2012 deaths
Footballers from Vigo
Spanish footballers
Association football forwards
La Liga players
Segunda División players
RC Celta de Vigo players
Real Madrid CF players
Deportivo de La Coruña players
Granada CF footballers
Spain B international footballers
Spain international footballers
Pichichi Trophy winners
Spanish football managers
La Liga managers
Deportivo de La Coruña managers